The Sister is a British psychological thriller directed by Niall MacCormick, and adapted by Neil Cross from his novel Burial.  The four-part series stars  Russell Tovey, Bertie Carvel, Amrita Acharia and Nina Toussaint-White  and was first broadcast on ITV from 26 to 29 October 2020. It was released as a Hulu original in 2021. The original title was Because the Night.

Cast 
 Russell Tovey as Nathan Redman
 Bertie Carvel as Robert “Bob” Morrow
 Amrita Acharia as Holly Fox
 Amanda Root as June Fox
 Paul Bazely as Graham Fox
 Simone Ashley as Elise Fox
 Nina Toussaint-White as DCI Jacki Hadley
 Ewan Bailey as DCI William Holloway

Episodes

Critical reception
The series has received generally positive reviews from critics.  Lucy Mangan of The Guardian described the drama as "a supernaturally-tinged dose of nail-bitery, doled out in suspenseful chunks". She praised the acting of lead Russell Tovey, whose portrayal of an "Everyman, suffering as an essentially good person trapped in a worsening hell not of his own making" made the viewing "absolutely agonising" and his depiction of guilt "genuinely moving". She considered the supernatural element "well-handled, even if I wish the connection between ghosts et al and our internal but very real horrors had been more fully explored rather than merely hinted at." Sean O'Grady of The Independent thought that, although the drama is filmed in "horror-movie cliché" of "dark, rainy nights in shadowy woods with ghoulish dialogue" that made it "ideal for near-Halloween viewing", the "strength of the cast and the very clever, subtle way" Neil Cross told the story saved it from being risible, and Cross had achieved the aim of making "the viewers sleep with the lights on".

References

External links
 

2020 British television series debuts
2020 British television series endings
2020s British drama television series
2020s British television miniseries
British thriller television series
ITV television dramas
Television series by Euston Films
Television series by Fremantle (company)
English-language television shows
Works by Neil Cross